The 1976 Women's World Open was a women's snooker tournament that took place in Middlesbrough in 1976. Vera Selby won the final 4–0 against Muriel Hazeldene.

Background and Tournament summary
The tournament was sponsored by Embassy and run together with the men's 1976 World Snooker Championship.

The top seed, was Joyce Gardner, the only professional player. Gardner had been three times runner-up in the Women's Professional Snooker Championship from 1934 to 1937; and seven times Women's Professional Billiards Champion from 1930 to 1938. She lost in her first match to eventual runner-up Muriel Hazeldene.

The Second seed was Vera Selby, who had won the UK national amateur snooker title for the previous four seasons, and had held the corresponding billiards title since 1970.

Other competitors included the past amateur champions Maureen Baynton and Rosemary De Lasso (née Davies), who both came out of retirement; Marion Westaway from Australia; and two players from Canada, 16-year-old Canadian champion Natalie Stelmach, and Sheila King.

Selby lost only one  on the way to winning the title.

Knockout 
Players listed in bold indicate match winner.

References

World Women's Snooker Championship
Women's World Open (snooker)
Women's World Open (snooker)
Women's World Open (snooker)
Women's World Open (snooker)
International sports competitions hosted by England
Women's sports competitions in England